Shikha Swaroop (born 23 October 1968) is an Indian actress, and a former Miss India International winner. While still in college, she tied Miss India International in 1988 with Shabnam Patel and continued to wear this crown until 1991 when she relinquished it to Preeti Mankotia. No beauty contests were held during 1989 and 1990 due to the demise of the sponsor, Eve's Weekly. The contests resumed after a new sponsor, Femina, took over in 1991. Apart from being crowned Miss India 1988, she won a gold medal in the All India Pistol Shooting Championship in 1988 itself. In addition to modeling and being the brand ambassador for many products she was a fashion model for over 400 shows in India and abroad. She also played badminton on a national level. At 5 feet 11 inches tall, she was the tallest actress at that time. Her career catapulted, but she suffered major setbacks when she became seriously ill.

Career
She appeared in several 1990s Hindi Films, and on television in Chandrakanta which was a huge hit. In the 1980s and early 1990s Shikha was considered one of the most desirable women in India. She appeared as a lead in 11 movies, some of which were multi starrers: Anil Sharma's Tahalka, Policewala Gunda, Pranlal Mehta's Police Public, Gulshan Kumar's Naag Mani, Kayda Kanoon, Pyar Hua Chori Chori, Cheetah, Thanedarni and Awaaz De Kahan Hai.

Her other popular TV shows are Himesh Reshammiya's Andaaz, Amarprem, Anupama, Sunil Agnihotri's Yug and Siddhant Vision's Kahan Se Kahan tak. She made a comeback with TV serial Kahani Chandrakanta Ki. She also played the role of Kaikeyi in the Zee TV show Ramayan.

Personal life
Shikha was married to Army pilot Rajiv Lal, but later they separated.

References

External links

Living people
Femina Miss India winners
Indian television actresses
Female models from Delhi
St. Stephen's College, Delhi alumni
Delhi University alumni
1970 births